California's 46th congressional district is a congressional district in the U.S. state of California.

It has been represented by Democrat Lou Correa since 2017, when he succeeded Loretta Sanchez, who retired to run for the U.S. Senate. The district is based in Orange County and includes the communities of Anaheim, Santa Ana, and Stanton, as well as parts of Orange and Fullerton.  It is both the most Democratic-leaning and most Latino congressional district in Orange County.

The congressional district contains the theme park Disneyland and Angel Stadium.

From 2003 to 2013 the district covered part of Los Angeles County and Orange County. It included Huntington Beach, Costa Mesa and Rancho Palos Verdes.

Competitiveness

In statewide races

Composition

As of the 2020 redistricting, California's 38th congressional district is located in Southern California. It is entirely within western Orange County.

Orange County is split between this district, the 40th district, the 45th district, and the 47th district. The 46th and 40th are partitioned by E La Palma Ave, E Jackson Ave, E Frontera St, Santa Ana River, Riverside Freeway, Costa Mesa Freeway, N Tustin St, E Meats Ave, N Orange Olive Rd, Garden Grove Freeway, 16909 Donwest-16791 E Main St, E Chestnut Ave, 16282 E Main St-717 S Lyon St, E McFadden Ave, Warner Ave, and Red Hill Ave.

The 46th, 45th, and 47th are partitioned by Red Hill Ave, E Alton Parkway, Costa Mesa Freeway, Sunflower Ave, Harbor Blvd, MacArthur Blvd, Santa Ana River, W Lehnhardt Ave, Gloxinia Ave, Lilac Way, Edinger Ave, Pebble Ct, 10744 W Lehnhardt Ave-10726 Kedge Ave, 724 S Sail St-5641 W Barbette Ave-407 S Starboard St, Starboard St/S Cooper St, Taft St, Hazard Ave, N Euclid St, Westminster Ave, Clinton St, 14300 Clinton St-1001 Mar Les Dr, Mar Les Dr, 2729 Huckleberry Rd, N Fairview St, Fairview St, 13462 Garden Grove Blvd-13252 Marty Ln, Townley St/Siemon Ave, W Garden Grove Blvd, S Lewis St, W Chapman Ave, E Simmons Ave, S Haster St, Ascot Dr, W Orangewood Ave, S 9th St, 2209 S Waverly Dr-11751 S Waverly Dr, Euclid St, Haven Ln, W Dudley Ave, S Euclid St, Katella Ave, Dale St, Rancho Alamitos High School, Orangewood Ave, Barber City Channel, Arrowhead St, Del Rey Dr, Westcliff Dr, Lampson Ave, Fern St, Garden Glove Blvd, Union Pacific Railroad, 7772 W Chapman Ave-Bently Ave, Highway 39, Western Ave, Stanton Storm Channel, Knott Ave, 6970 Via Kannela-6555 Katella Ave, Cerritos Ave, 10490 Carlotta Ave-Ball Rd, John Beat Park, S Knott Ave, Solano Dr, Monterra Way, Campesina Dr, Holder Elementary School, W Orange Ave, 6698 Via Riverside Way-Orangeview Junior High School, W Lincoln Ave, 195 N Western Ave-298 N Western Ave, 3181 W Coolidge Ave-405 N Dale St, W Crescent Ave, N La Reina St, W La Palma Ave, Boisseranc Park, I-5 HOV Lane, Orangethorpe Ave, Fullerton Creek, Whitaker St, Commonwealth Ave, Los Angeles County Metro, W Malvern Ave, W Chapman Ave, E Chapman Ave, S Placentia Ave, Kimberly Ave, E Orangethorpe Ave, and 2500 E Terrace St-Highway 57.

The 46th district takes in the cities of Santa Ana, Stanton, Anaheim, southern Fullerton, and western Orange

Cities & CDP with 10,000 or more people
 Anaheim - 346,824
 Santa Ana - 310,277
 Fullerton - 143,617
 Orange - 139,911
 Stanton - 37,962

List of members representing the district

Election results

1992

1994

1996

1998

2000

2002

2004

2006

2008

2010

2012

2014

2016

2018

2020

2022

Historical district boundaries
The 2003–2013 iteration of the district was commonly considered to be typical of gerrymandering. It covered some or all of the following cities in Orange County: Costa Mesa, Fountain Valley, Huntington Beach, Los Alamitos, Seal Beach, and Westminster. In Los Angeles County, the district covered Rancho Palos Verdes, Rolling Hills, Rolling Hills Estates, Palos Verdes Estates part of Long Beach, and a very small portion of the San Pedro neighborhood of the City of Los Angeles, and Santa Catalina Island, on which Avalon was the only city. The district also included the whole of the Port of Los Angeles and Long Beach.

See also
List of United States congressional districts

References

External links
GovTrack.us: California's 46th congressional district
RAND California Election Returns: District Definitions
California Voter Foundation map - CD46

46
Anaheim, California
Garden Grove, California
Orange, California
Santa Ana, California
Government in Orange County, California
Constituencies established in 1993
1993 establishments in California